Robert Louis Johnson (born April 8, 1946) is an American entrepreneur, media magnate, executive, philanthropist, and investor. He is the co-founder of BET, which was acquired by Viacom in 2001. He also founded RLJ Companies, a holding company that invests in various business sectors. Johnson is the former majority owner of the Charlotte Bobcats. He became the first African-American billionaire in 2001. Johnson's companies have counted among the most prominent African-American businesses in the late twentieth and early twenty-first centuries.

Early life and education
Johnson was born in 1946 in Hickory, Mississippi, the ninth out of ten children to Edna and Archie Johnson. His mother was a schoolteacher and his father was a farmer. His parents moved the family to Freeport, Illinois, when he was a child. He was an honors student in high school. Johnson graduated from the University of Illinois in 1968 with a bachelor's degree in social studies. While at the University of Illinois, Johnson became a member of the Beta chapter of Kappa Alpha Psi fraternity. He received a master's degree in public affairs from the Woodrow Wilson School at Princeton University in 1972.

Career

After graduating from Princeton, Johnson found a job in Washington, D.C., which introduced him to the television industry. He served as the public affairs director for the Corporation for Public Broadcasting. In this position is where he learned of the power and untapped potential of television. Around the same time he also worked as the director of communications for the Washington, D.C. office of the National Urban League. Johnson worked as a press secretary for Congressman Walter E. Fauntroy. He later became vice president of government relations at the National Cable and Television Association (NCTA). In 1980, Johnson launched Black Entertainment Television, which became a full-fledged channel in 1983.

Johnson left NCTA in 1979 to create Black Entertainment Television, the first cable television network aimed at African-Americans. When the network launched in 1980, it only aired for two hours on Friday night. BET first turned a profit in 1985 and it became the first black-controlled company listed on the New York Stock Exchange in 1991. In 1998, Johnson and Liberty Media bought all outstanding shares of the company. This purchase gave Johnson 42% of the company. Viacom acquired BET in 2001 for a reported $3 billion; Johnson earned over $1 billion from the sale, making him the first black American billionaire. He remained BET CEO until 2006.

Johnson founded The RLJ Companies, a holding company with a diverse portfolio including hotel real estate investment, private equity, financial services, asset management, automobile dealerships, sports and entertainment, and Video lottery terminal gaming. The RLJ Companies is headquartered in Bethesda, Maryland.

By January 2009, Ion Media had another subchannel network, Urban TV, in the works with him targeted to African-Americans.
Axiom Bank N.A. Maitland, Florida, was founded by Robert Johnson, who also founded the Black Entertainment Network (BET). As of 2013, Johnson was a member of the board of directors for RLJ Lodging Trust, RLJ Entertainment, Inc., KB Home, Lowe's Companies, Inc., Strayer Education, Think Finance, Inc., NBA Board of Governors, The Business Council, and the Smithsonian Institution's National Museum of African American History and Culture. Johnson has also served as a member of the board of directors for several other companies and organizations, including US Airways, Hilton Hotels, General Mills, the United Negro College Fund, and Deutsche Bank's Americas Advisory Board.

Johnson became the first African-American majority club owner of a major American sports league team with his 2002 purchase of the Charlotte Bobcats. In 2010, Johnson sold his majority stake in the Charlotte Bobcats to Michael Jordan.

In 2016, Johnson finalized a partnership agreement with AMC Networks through his RLJ Company after launching his own video on demand streaming service Urban Movie Channel in 2014. According to the agreement, AMC will use its programming and distribution clout to benefit Acorn and UMC. Additionally, the RLJ-AMC partnership will allow for greater investment in content from African-American creatives, Johnson emphasized. The agreement called for AMC to provide RLJ with a $60 million loan on a seven-year term and $5 million on a one-year term. AMC has received warrants to purchase at least 20 million shares or the equivalent of 50.1% of the company. The time frame for exercising those warrants is open-ended, AMC said.

Philanthropy
In 2011, Johnson worked with Morgan Freeman to raise funds for hurricane preparedness in the Bahamas. Johnson released a neckwear line in coordination with PVH and The Ella Rose Collection, the RLJ Ella Rose Africa Tie Collection, in 2012 to benefit the charitable organization Malaria No More.

In 2007, Johnson created the Liberia Enterprise Development Fund with a $30 million investment. The fund provides credit for Liberian entrepreneurs.

Political commentary
In January 2008, Johnson became the target of criticism for remarks he made to supporters of presidential candidate Hillary Clinton about another candidate, Senator (and eventual party nominee and election winner) Barack Obama. Johnson said, "As an African-American, I'm frankly insulted that the Obama campaign would imply that we are so stupid that we would think Bill and Hillary Clinton, who have been deeply and emotionally involved in black issues when Barack Obama was doing something in the neighborhood that I won't say what he was doing, [but] he said it in his book." This statement was widely interpreted as a criticism of Obama's acknowledged use of marijuana in his youth. The Clinton campaign denied this, submitting that the comments were referring to Obama's work as a community organizer. In subsequent days, Johnson was roundly criticized for his comments as hypocritical given the prodigious glorification of drug use and sale by artists prominently featured on BET. On January 17, 2008, Johnson sent Obama the following apology: 

On April 14, 2008, Johnson made comments to the effect that Obama would not be the Democratic Party's leading candidate if he were not black, in defense of a similar comment made by Geraldine Ferraro. He also went on to say "I make a joke about Obama doing drugs [and it's] 'Oh my God, a black man tearing down another black man.'"

During the 2020 election, Johnson made comments implying that he supported President Trump, stating "[w]here I come out as a businessman, I will take the devil I know over the devil I don't know anytime of the week."

Personal life
Johnson married Sheila Johnson in 1969. They divorced in 2001 and have two children. She is CEO of Salamander Hotels and Resorts and owner of Salamander Innisbrook Resort and Golf Club in Palm Harbor.  Johnson began dating Lauren Wooden, who is 33 years his junior, in 2010. As of 2016, Wooden was pursuing an international business-management doctorate in Paris. They married in May 2016; Greg Mathis officiated, and divorced in 2020.

See also
 List of African-American firsts
Black billionaires

References

External links
 Official website
 Johnson Sets Sights on New Urban Cable Network
 
 
 How I Built This - Live Episode! Black Entertainment Television: Robert Johnson
Interview with Robert Johnson, president and founder of BET, from KUT's In Black America series on the American Archive of Public Broadcasting, April 29, 1986

1946 births
Living people
African-American billionaires
African-American company founders
African-American businesspeople
American company founders
African-American sports executives and administrators
American sports executives and administrators
American billionaires
American mass media owners
American television executives
Businesspeople from Charlotte, North Carolina
Businesspeople from Illinois
Businesspeople from Mississippi
Charlotte Bobcats owners
Charlotte Sting owners
Freeport High School (Illinois) alumni
People from Freeport, Illinois
People from Hickory, Mississippi
People from Kosciusko, Mississippi
University of Illinois Urbana-Champaign alumni
Women's National Basketball Association executives
Princeton School of Public and International Affairs alumni
21st-century African-American people
20th-century African-American sportspeople